Margaret Ann McCaig (née Schnell; born June 1939) was the chancellor of the University of Calgary in Alberta from 1994 until 1998. She was named to the Alberta Order of Excellence in 2004.

References

1939 births
Living people
Canadian university and college chancellors
Canadian women academics
Women academic administrators
Members of the Alberta Order of Excellence
Canadian academic administrators